David Nthubu Koloane (5 June 1938 – 30 June 2019) was a South African artist. In his drawings, paintings and collages he explored questions about political injustice and human rights. Koloane is considered to have been "an influential artist and writer of the apartheid years" in South Africa.

Life 

David Koloane was born on 5 June 1938 in the township of Alexandra, a suburb of Johannesburg in South Africa. Already during high school he started being interested in art and doing art in his leisure time when not working to earn money for the family. From 1974 to 1977 Koloane attended art classes at the Bill Ainslie Studios, which later became the Johannesburg Art Foundation. In 1977, Koloane was one of the founding members of the first black gallery in South Africa, located in Johannesburg. His increasing dedication to art led him to start teaching at a high school in a township, first as a part-time job, later full-time. Also in the following years Koloane was very active and committed: in 1982, he co-curated the Culture and Resistance Arts Festival in Botswana, from 1986 to 1988 he was the curator of the Fuba Art Gallery in Johannesburg and in 1990 he co-ordinated and co-curated the Zabalaza Festivals in London, England.
Additionally, Koloane studied at the University of London from 1984 to 1985 and received a diploma in museology.

He participated in the 1989 Pachipamwe II Workshop held at Cyrene Mission outside Bulawayo, Zimbabwe alongside prominent artists including Joram Mariga, Bernard Matemera, Bill Ainslie, Voti Thebe, Sokari Douglas Camp and Adam Madebe.

Koloane created an artist residency called Bag Factory with collector Robert Loder in an area not strictly black or white during Apartheid segregation in 1991. Artists Sam Nhlengethwa and Kagiso Patrick Mautloa were the first resident artists and it went on to host William Kentridge, Helen Sebidi, Penny Siopis, Wayne Barker, Benon Lutaaya and Deborah Bell among many.

David Koloane's works are part of many collections worldwide, including the collections of the Johannesburg Art Gallery, The Contemporary African Art Collection (CAAC) of Jean Pigozzi, the South African National Gallery in Cape Town and the Botswana National Museum.

Work philosophy 

Koloane had a wide-ranging work area: as an artist, he always connected his own works to respective social controversies; furthermore, he contributed to various catalogues, curated exhibitions, was part of jury boards several times – amongst others in the advisory board of the National Arts Council, and published many articles both in South Africa and internationally.
In 1998, Koloane was honored with a Prince Claus Award for his contribution to the development of art in South Africa.

He states about his work:
"My concern in socio-political matters and contributions to the furtherance of disadvantaged black South African artists during and after the apartheid era is evident. My work can be said to reflect the socio-political landscape of South Africa both past and present. The socio political conditions created by the apartheid system of government have to a large extent transfixed the human condition as the axis around which my work evolves. The human figure has become the icon of creative expression".

Exhibitions (selection) 
1977 Nedbank Gallery Killarney, Johannesburg, South Africa
1977 The Gallery, Johannesburg, South Africa
1978 Black Expo ‘78, Johannesburg, South Africa
1979 Gallery 101, Johannesburg, South Africa
1979 Bill Ainslie Studios, Gallery, Johannesburg, South Africa
1982 Art towards social development, National Gallery and Museum, Gaborone, Botswana
1984 Stockwell Studio exhibition, London, UK
1985 Gallery 198, London, UK
1985 Fuba Gallery, Johannesburg, South Africa
1986 Historical perspective of Black South African artists French Alliance, Pretoria, South Africa
1987 Portraits: UNISA Art Gallery, Pretoria, South Africa
1987 Contemporary Black artists Academy Art Gallery, Paris, France
1988 Pachipamwe international artists workshop Zimbabwe National Gallery Harare, Zimbabwe
1989 The Neglected Tradition Exhibition, Johannesburg Art Gallery, Johannesburg, South Africa
1989 African encounter, Dome Gallery, New York City
1990 Art from South Africa Museum of Modern Art, Oxford, UK
1990 South African Mural Exhibition, I.C.A. Gallery London, UK
1990 Gallery on the Market, with Michael Zondi, Johannesburg, South Africa
1999/2000 Galerie Seippel, Cologne, Germany, Global Art - South African Contemporary Art (group)
2000 Liberated Voices Exhibition, Museum of African Art, New York City
2001 Goodman Gallery, Johannesburg, South Africa
2002 Goodman Gallery, Johannesburg, South Africa
2002 Kunstraum Sylt-Quelle, Rantum/Sylt, Germany, Tracing the Rainbow (group)
2002 Galerie Seippel, Cologne, Germany, Johannesburg Blues
2003 Galerie Seippel, Cologne, Germany, Tracing the Rainbow (group)
2003 Goodman Gallery, Johannesburg, South Africa
2004 "The ID of South African Artists", Amsterdam, Netherlands
2004 Museum Bochum Deutschland, New Identities (group)
2008 Museum Goch, Goch, Germany, Works on Paper, hommage to David Kolane's 70th birthday

Literature 

Schamp, Matthias, David Koloane, und Stephan Mann. David Koloane: Arbeiten Auf Papier. Hommage Zum 70. Geburtstag. Kerber Christof Verlag, 2008.
Kröner, Magdalena, Der Rhythmus der Stadt, Die Malerei David Koloanes, in: Museum Bochum, New Identities - Zeitgenössische Kunst aus Südafrika, S.82ff, 2004, HatjeCantz Verlag 
Tadjo, Véronique, und David Koloane, David Koloane (David Krut Pub., 2002).
Ralf-P. Seippel, Indra Wussow: David Koloane, S. 32 f, in: Tracing the Rainbow, 2002, Seippel Verlag, 
Bogatzke, H., R. Brockmann, und C. Ludszuweit. Ondambo: African art forum. Gamsberg Macmillan, 2000. (S. 30–49, S. 174–177)
Ralf-P. Seippel, David Koloane, Art Dialogue, South Africa - Germany, 1999, 
Berman, Esmé. Painting in South Africa. Southern Book Publishers, 1993. (S. 363)
Deliss, Clémentine, Whitechapel Art Gallery, Malmö konsthall, und Guggenheim Museum Soho. 7 stories about modern art in Africa. Flammarion, 1995. (S. 140–156, S. 261–265)
Herreman, Frank and D’Amato, Mark. Liberated voices: contemporary art from South Africa. The Museum for African Art, 1999. (S. 27)
Kasfir, Sidney Littlefield, and Gus Gordon. Contemporary African Art. Paw Prints, 2008. (S. 159–161)

Awards 
2015 – Doctor of Fine Art (honoris causa), Rhodes University

References

External links 
David Koloane infos at trent-art.co.za
A R T T H R O B / A R T B I O infos at artthrob
Goodman Gallery: artists | show artist's profile on the Goodman Gallery's homepage

David Koloane infos at artprintsa.com
David Koloane | Dead Revolutionaries Club article on the website "Dead Revolutionaries Club"
 infos at joburg.co.za
CV David Koloane : vgallery.co.za artist's profile on the V Gallery's homepage
The artistic legacy of apartheid (October 26, 2001) article on Palo Alto Online
David Koloane - Gallery of Prints infos at artists-press.net

2019 deaths
South African painters
South African male painters
Contemporary painters
1938 births
People from Alexandra, Gauteng